Ivan Vasilev Redovski (born 10 September 1981) is a Bulgarian footballer who currently plays as a forward for Lokomotiv 2012 Mezdra.

References

1981 births
Living people
Bulgarian footballers
First Professional Football League (Bulgaria) players
Second Professional Football League (Bulgaria) players
PFC Slavia Sofia players
FC Botev Vratsa players
PFC Svetkavitsa players
PFC Vidima-Rakovski Sevlievo players
PFC Rodopa Smolyan players
PFC Spartak Pleven players
PFC Marek Dupnitsa players
Akademik Sofia players
PFC Lokomotiv Mezdra players
Association football forwards
Bulgarian football managers
People from Botevgrad
Sportspeople from Sofia Province